Thomas Corrin (1878–1936) was an English footballer who played in the Football League for Everton and in the Southern League for Millwall Athletic, Plymouth Argyle, Portsmouth and Reading.

References

1878 births
1936 deaths
English footballers
Association football forwards
English Football League players
Everton F.C. players
Portsmouth F.C. players
Reading F.C. players
Plymouth Argyle F.C. players
Millwall F.C. players
Southern Football League players